Thamnophis proximus rubrilineatus, the redstripe ribbon snake, is a subspecies of the western ribbon snake, a garter snake endemic to the southern United States.

Geographic range
It is found in West Texas on the Edwards Plateau.

Description
This species has a distinctive red stripe down the center of the back, to which both the common name and the subspecific name refer.

Habitat and behavior
It is semiaquatic, spending most of its time on the edge of permanent bodies of water such as swamps, ponds, lakes, or slow-moving streams. It is fast-moving and an excellent swimmer.

Diet
Its primary diet is amphibians, such as the northern cricket frog (Acris crepitans), but it will also consume lizards and small rodents.

References

Further reading
 Rossman, D.A. (1963). The Colubrid Snake Genus Thamnophis: A Revision of the sauritus Group. Bull. Florida State Mus. Biol. Sci. 7(3):99-178.

proximus rubrilineatus
Reptiles of the United States
Reptiles described in 1963
Taxa named by Douglas A. Rossman